Auči is a village in Salgale Parish, Jelgava Municipality in the Semigallia region of Latvia. The village is located on the Lielupe River approximately 18 km from the city of Jelgava.

Towns and villages in Latvia
Jelgava Municipality
Doblen County
Semigallia